Munyaradzi Gwisai  is a Zimbabwean politician and general coordinator of the International Socialist Organization in Zimbabwe. He was a member of the parliament on a ticket of the Movement for Democratic Change from 2000 until he was expelled from the MDC in 2002 and lost the subsequent by-election.

Personal life

Munya currently lives in Harare, Zimbabwe. He teaches at the university of Zimbabwe, and also is partner at Matika, Gwisai and Partners in Harare and represents people all over the country. He has two children named Rosa and Sankara. Rosa is 16 years old and attending Goldridge College in Kwe Kwe, Zimbabwe and dreams of being a lawyer just like her father. And Sankara is 15 years old and attends St Andrews college in Makanda. And will be a future NBA player.

In February 2011, Gwisai and 45 others were arrested after watching video footage of the Arab Spring at a public meeting and were charged with treason, which carries the death penalty in Zimbabwe. Gwisai's wife, Shantha Bloemen, claims "the strategy of the regime at the moment is to stall it for as long as possible for propaganda value, to instill fear in people." The move has been condemned by Human Rights Watch and Amnesty International. Gwisai was released with a fine in 2012.

References

External links
ISO in Zimbabwe

Living people
Dissidents
International Socialist Organisation (Zimbabwe)
Trotskyists
Zimbabwean democracy activists
Zimbabwean prisoners and detainees
Movement for Democratic Change – Tsvangirai politicians
Prisoners and detainees of Zimbabwe
Academic staff of the University of Zimbabwe
People charged with treason
1968 births